The PMPC Star Award for Best Public Service Program is given to the best television public service of the year and also public service program hosts.

Winners

Public Service Programs

1987: Kapwa Ko Mahal Ko (GMA 7)

1988:

1989: Damayan (PTV 4)

1990:

1991: Hotline sa Trese (IBC 13)

1992: Eye to Eye (GMA 7)

1993: Hoy Gising! (ABS-CBN 2)

1994: 

1995: 

1996: 

1997: 

1998: not given

1999: 

2000: Hoy Gising! (ABS-CBN 2)

2001: Imbestigador (GMA 7)

2002: Mission X (ABS-CBN 2)

2003: Wish Ko Lang (GMA 7)

2004: Imbestigador (GMA 7)

2005: Bitag (IBC 13)

2006: Wish Ko Lang (GMA 7)

2007: Bitag (UNTV 37)

2008: Bitag (UNTV 37)

2009: Imbestigador (GMA 7)

2010: Bitag (UNTV 37)

2011: Bitag (UNTV 37)

2012: Wish Ko Lang (GMA 7)

2013: Imbestigador (GMA 7)

2014: T3: Enforced (TV5)

2015: T3: Enforced (TV5)

2016: Buhay OFW (Aksyon TV) & Mission Possible (ABS-CBN 2)

2017: Wish Ko Lang (GMA 7)

2018: Healing Galing (TV5)

2019: Healing Galing (TV5)

2021: Healing Galing (TV5)

Public Service Program Hosts

1987: Cielito del Mundo and Orly Mercado (Kapwa Ko Mahal Ko / GMA 7)

1988:

1989: Rosa Rosal (Damayan / PTV 4)

1990: Joseph Estrada and Cory Quirino (Hotline sa Trese / IBC 13)

1991: Joseph Estrada and Cory Quirino (Hotline sa Trese / IBC 13)

1992: 

1993: Inday Badiday (Eye to Eye / GMA 7)

1994: Inday Badiday (Eye to Eye / GMA 7)

1995: 

1996: 

1997: 

1998: not given

1999: 

2000: Ted Failon (Hoy Gising / ABS-CBN 2)

2001: Mike Enriquez (Imbestigador / GMA 7)

2002: Erwin Tulfo (Mission X / ABS-CBN 2)

2003: Willie Revillame (Willingly Yours / ABS-CBN 2)

2004: Vicky Morales (Wish Ko Lang / GMA 7)

2005: Ben Tulfo (Bitag / IBC 13)

2006: Mike Enriquez (Imbestigador / GMA 7)

2007: Vicky Morales (Wish Ko Lang / GMA 7)

2008: Ben Tulfo (Bitag / UNTV 37)

2009: Ben Tulfo (Bitag Live / UNTV 37)

2010: Vicky Morales (Wish Ko Lang / GMA 7)

2011: Presida Acosta (Public Atorni / TV5)

2012: Presida Acosta (Public Atorni / TV5)

2013: Vicky Morales (Wish Ko Lang / GMA 7)

2014: Vicky Morales (Wish Ko Lang / GMA 7)

2015: Vicky Morales (Wish Ko Lang / GMA 7)

2016: Julius Babao (Mission: Possible / ABS-CBN 2)

2017: Vicky Morales (Wish Ko Lang / GMA 7)

2018: Vicky Morales (Wish Ko Lang / GMA 7)

2019: Edinell Calvario (Healing Galing / TV5)

2021: Edinell Calvario (Healing Galing / TV5)

PMPC Star Awards for Television